Grand Cul-de-Sac is a quartier of Saint Barthélemy, Caribbean. It is located in the northeastern part of the island.

Populated places in Saint Barthélemy
Quartiers of Saint Barthélemy